The Puranic chronology is a timeline of Hindu history based on the Mahabharata, the Ramayana, and the Puranas. Two central dates are the Mahabharata War, and the start of the Kali Yuga. The Puranic chronology is referred to by proponents of Indigenous Aryans to propose an earlier dating of the Vedic period, and the spread of Indo-European languages out of India, arguing that "the Indian civilization must be viewed as an unbroken tradition that goes back to the earliest period of the Sindhu-Sarasvati (or Indus) tradition (7000 or 8000 BCE)."

Hindu scriptures
The Mahabharata and the Rāmāyaṇa are the two major Sanskrit epics of ancient India. Together they form the Hindu Itihasa. The Mahābhārata narrates the struggle between two groups of cousins in the Kurukshetra War, and the fates of the Kaurava and the Pāṇḍava princes and their successors. It also contains philosophical and devotional material, such as a discussion of the four "goals of life" or puruṣārtha (12.161). The bulk of the Mahābhārata was probably compiled between the 3rd century BCE and the 3rd century CE, with the oldest preserved parts not much older than around 400 BCE.

The Rāmāyaṇa narrates the life of Rama, the legendary prince of the Kosala Kingdom. Various recent scholars' estimates for the earliest stage of the text range from the 7th to 4th centuries BCE, with later stages extending up to the 3rd century CE.

The Puranas (literally "ancient, old",) is a vast genre of Indian literature about a wide range of topics, particularly legends and other traditional lore, composed in the first millennium CE. The Hindu Puranas are anonymous texts and likely the work of many authors over the centuries. Gavin Flood connects the rise of the written Purana historically with the rise of  devotional cults centering upon a particular deity in the Gupta era: the Puranic corpus is a complex body of material that advance the views of various competing sampradayas. The content is highly inconsistent across the Puranas, and each Purana has survived in numerous manuscripts which are themselves inconsistent.

The Mahabharata, Ramayana and the Puranas contain genealogies of kings, which are used for the traditional chronology of India's ancient history.

Puranic chronology

Cyclic time and yugas

The Puranas are oriented at a cyclical understanding of time. They contain stories about the creation and destruction of the world, and the yugas (ages). There are four yugas in one cycle:
 Satya Yuga (a time of truth and righteousness)
 Treta Yuga
 Dvapara Yuga
 Kali Yuga (a time of darkness and non-virtue)

According to the Manusmriti ( 2nd CE), one of the earliest known texts describing the yugas, the length of each yuga is 4800, 3600, 2400 and 1200 years of the gods, respectively, giving a total of 12,000 divine years to complete one cycle. For human years, they are multiplied by 360 giving 1,728,000, 1,296,000, 864,000 and 432,000 years, respectively, giving a total of 4,320,000 human years. These four yugas have a length ratio of 4:3:2:1.

The Bhagavata Purana [3.11.18-20] ( 500-1000 CE) gives a matching description of the yuga lengths in divine years.

The Kali Yuga is the present yuga. According to Puranic sources, Krishna's departure marks the end of Dvapara Yuga and the start of Kali Yuga, which is dated to 17/18 February 3102 BCE, twenty years after the Bharata War.

Dashavatara

The Dashavatara refers to the ten primary (i.e. full or complete) incarnations (avatars) of Vishnu, the Hindu god of preservation which has Rigvedic origins. Vishnu is said to descend in the form of an avatar to restore cosmic order.

Various versions of the list of Vishnu's avatars exist, varying per region and tradition. Some lists mention Krishna as the eighth avatar and the Buddha as the ninth avatar, while others – such as the Yatindramatadipika, a 17th-century summary of Srivaisnava doctrine – give Balarama as the eighth avatar and Krishna as the ninth. The latter version is followed by some Vaishnavas who don't accept the Buddha as an incarnation of Vishnu. Though no list can be uncontroversially presented as standard, the "most accepted list found in Puranas and other texts is [...] Krishna, Buddha."

The following table summarises the position of avatars within the Dashavatara in many but not all traditions:

Pre-Bharata War kings and avatars

The Puranas, the Mahabharata and the Ramayana contain lists of kings and genealogies, from which the traditional chronology of India's ancient history are derived. Megasthenes, the Greek ambassador to the Maurya court at Patna at  300 BCE, reported to have heard of a traditional list of 153 kings that covered 6042 years, beyond the traditional beginning of the Kali Yuga in 3102 BCE. The royal lists are based on Sūta bardic traditions, and are derived from lists which were orally transmitted and constantly reshaped.

Shraddhadeva Manu
The first king is Shraddhadeva Manu, the seventh and current Manu of the fourteen manus of the current kalpa (aeon), the progenitor of humanity. According to the Puranas, the genealogy of Shraddhadeva is as follows:
 Brahma
 Marichi, one of the 10 Prajapatis ("lord of creation and protector") created by Brahma, and one of the Saptarishis.
 Kashyapa, son of Marichi and his wife, Kala. Kashyapa is one of the Saptarishis, the seven ancient sages of the Rigveda who are the patriarchs of the Vedic religion, and the ancestors of the Gotras of Brahmins.
 Vivasvan or Surya (sun, solar deity), son of Kashyapa and Aditi.
 Vaivasvata Manu, the son of Vivasvan and Saranyu (Saṃjñā). He is also known as Satyavrata and Shraddhadeva.

Shraddhadeva had seventy children, including Ila and Ikshvaku, the progenitors of the Lunar and Solar dynasties of the kshatriyas, which play a prominent role in the origin stories of the royal families of the Vedic period. The Mahabharata states that "it is of Manu that all men including Brahmanas, Kshatriyas, Vaishyas, Sudras, and others have been descended."

Tentative chronology
The Puranas have been used by some to give a tentative overview of Indian history prior to the Bharata War. Gulshan (1940) dates the start of the reign of Manu Vaivasvata at 7350 BCE. According to Ganguly, the Puranic gives 95 kings between Shraddhadeva Manu (aka Manu Vaivasvata), the progenitor of humanity, and the Bharata War. Dating the Bharata War at 1400 BCE, A.D. Pusalkar (1962) uses this list to give the following chronology:
 Pre-flood tradition and the dawn of history
 The great flood and Manu Vaivasvata
 The period of king Yayāti (c. 3000–2750 BCE)
 The period of king Mandhatri (c. 2750–2550 BCE)
 The epoch of Parashurama, the sixth avatar of Vishnu (c. 2550–2350 BCE)
 The era of Rama, the seventh avatar of Vishnu (c. 2350–1750 BCE)
 The period of Krishna, the eighth avatar of Vishnu (c.1950–1400 BCE)
 The Mahabharata War (c. 1400 BCE)

According to Subhash Kak,

Bharata War

The historicity of the Mahabharata War is subject to scholarly discussion and dispute. The existing text of the Mahabharata went through many layers of development, and mostly belongs to the period between c. 500 BCE and 400 CE. Within the frame story of the Mahabharata, the historical kings Parikshit and Janamejaya are featured significantly as scions of the Kuru clan, and Michael Witzel concludes that the general setting of the epic has a historical precedent in Iron Age (Vedic) India, where the Kuru kingdom was the center of political power during roughly 1200 to 800 BCE. According to Professor Alf Hiltebeitel, the Mahabharata is essentially mythological. Indian historian Upinder Singh has written that:

Despite the inconclusiveness of the data, attempts have been made to assign a historical date to the Kurukshetra War.

Attempts to date the events using methods of archaeoastronomy have produced, depending on which passages are chosen and how they are interpreted, estimates ranging from the late 4th to the mid-2nd millennium BCE. Popular tradition holds that the war marks the transition to Kali Yuga. The late 4th-millennium date has a precedent in the calculation of the Kali Yuga epoch, based on planetary conjunctions, by Aryabhata (6th century). Aryabhata's date of 18 February 3102  BCE for Mahābhārata war has become widespread in Indian tradition. Some sources mark this as the disappearance of Krishna from the Earth. The Aihole inscription of Pulikeshi II, dated to Saka 556 = 634 CE, claims that 3735 years have elapsed since the Bharata battle, putting the date of Mahābhārata war at 3137 BCE. Another traditional school of astronomers and historians, represented by Vriddha-Garga, Varahamihira (author of the Brhatsamhita) and Kalhana (author of the Rajatarangini), place the Bharata war 653 years after the Kali Yuga epoch, corresponding to 2449 BCE.

Some of the other proposals that have been put forward:

 Vedveer Arya gives the date of 3162 BCE, by distinguishing between Śaka & Śakanta Eras and applying correction of 60 years to the date given in popular tradition and based on Aihole inscription.
 P. V. Holey states a date of 13 November 3143 BCE using planetary positions and calendar systems.
 K. Sadananda, based on translation work, states that the Kurukshetra War started on 22 November 3067 BCE.
 B. N. Achar used planetarium software to argue that the Mahabharata War took place in 3067 BCE.
 S. Balakrishna concluded a date of 2559 BCE using consecutive lunar eclipses.
 R. N. Iyengar concluded a date of 1478 BCE using double eclipses and Saturn+Jupiter conjunctions.
 P. R. Sarkar estimates a date of 1298 BCE for the war of Kurukshetra.
 Dieter Koch dates the war to 1198 BCE based on super-conjunctions.
 Kesheo Lakshman Daftari, one of the members of the Calendar Reform Committee which prepared the Indian national calendar, holds that the war took place in 1197 BCE.

Post-Bharata War
The Vedic Foundation gives the following chronology of ancient India since the time of Krishna and the Bharata War:
 3228 BCE – Descension of Krishna
 3138 BCE – The Mahabharata War; start of Brihadrath dynasty of Magadha; start of Yudhisthir dynasty of Hastinapur
 3102 BCE – Ascension of Krishna; start of Kali Yuga
 2139 BCE – End of Brihadratha dynasty
 2139–2001 BCE – Pradyota dynasty
 2001–1641 BCE – Shaishunaga dynasty
 1887–1807 BCE – Gautama Buddha
 1641–1541 BCE – Nandas
 1541–1241 BCE – Maurya Empire
 1541–1507 BCE – Chandragupta Maurya
 1507–1479 BCE – Bindusara
 1479–1443 BCE – Ashokavardhan
 1241–784 BCE – Shunga Empire and Kanva dynasty
 784–328 BCE – Andhra dynasty
 328–83 BCE – Gupta Empire
 328–321 BCE – Chandragupta Vijayaditya
 326 BCE – Alexander's invasion
 321–270 BCE – Ashoka
 102 BCE – 15 CE – Vikramaditya, established Vikram era in 57 BCE

Indigenous Aryans - '10,000 years in India'

Indigenous Aryans

The Epic-Puranic chronology has been referred to by proponents of Indigenous Aryans, putting into question the Indo-Aryan migrations at ca. 1500 BCE and proposing older dates for the Vedic period. According to the "Indigenist position", the Aryans are indigenous to India, and the Indo-European languages radiated out from a homeland in India into their present locations. According to them, the Vedas are older than second millennium BCE, and scriptures like the Mahabaratha reflect historical events which took place before 1500 BCE. Some of them equate the Indus Valley civilisation with the Vedic Civilization, state that the Indus script was the progenitor of the Brahmi, and state that there is no difference between the people living in (northern) Indo-European part and the (southern) Dravidian part. 

The Indigenous Aryans theory has no relevance, let alone support, in mainstream scholarship.

'10,000 years in India'

The idea of "Indigenous Aryanism" fits into traditional Hindu ideas about their religion, namely that it has timeless origins, with the Vedic Aryans inhabiting India since ancient times.

M. S. Golwalkar, in his 1939 publication We or Our Nationhood Defined, famously stated that "Undoubtedly [...] we — Hindus — have been in undisputed and undisturbed possession of this land for over eight or even ten thousand years before the land was invaded by any foreign race." Golwalkar was inspired by Tilak's The Arctic Home in the Vedas (1903), who argued that the Aryan homeland was located at the North Pole, basing this idea on Vedic hymns and Zoroastrian texts. Gowalkar took over the idea of 10,000 years, arguing that the North Pole at that time was located in India.

Subhash Kak, a main proponent of the "indigenist position", underwrites the Vedic-Puranic chronology, and uses it to recalculate the dates of the Vedas and the Vedic people. According to Kak, "the Indian civilization must be viewed as an unbroken tradition that goes back to the earliest period of the Sindhu-Sarasvati (or Indus) tradition (7000 or 8000 BC)." According to Sudhir Bhargava, the Vedas were composed 10,000 years ago, when Manu supposedly lived, in ashrams at the banks of the Sarasvati river in Brahmavarta, the ancient home-base of the Aryans. According to Sudhir Bhargava, people from Brahmavarta moved out from Brahmavarta into and outside India after 4500 BCE, when seismic activities had changed the course of the Sarasvati and other rivers.

See also
 Yuga
 Vedas
 Vedic science
 Solar dynasty
 Lunar dynasty
 Hindu cosmology
 Nasadiya Sukta
 Samudra Manthana
 Sanātana Dharma
 Brahmanda Purana
 History of India
 History of Hinduism
 Hindu mythological wars
 Puru and Yadu Dynasties
 List of Indian monarchs
 List of Hindu empires and dynasties

Notes

References

Sources

Printed sources

Web-sources

Further reading

External links
Indigenous understanding of Puranic chronology
 Chronological chart of the history of Bharatvarsh since its origination
 Royal Chronology and History of INDIA (Bharat)
 Hindu Timeline
 Reclaiming the chronology of Bharatvam
 Bharatiya Timeline
 The History of Bharata or India According to Indian Astronomy
Scholarly studies of Indian history
 Sahal Muhammed (2019), How Science Has Destroyed the Foundation of RSS' Idea of India

 
 

 
History of Hinduism
Indigenous Aryanism
Krishna